Vårgårda is a locality and the seat of Vårgårda Municipality, Västra Götaland County, Sweden with 5 825 inhabitants in 2020.

Gallery

References 

Municipal seats of Västra Götaland County
Swedish municipal seats
Populated places in Västra Götaland County
Populated places in Vårgårda Municipality